Internal fertilization is the union of an egg and sperm cell during sexual reproduction inside the female body. Internal fertilization, unlike its counterpart, external fertilization, brings more control to the female with reproduction. For internal fertilization to happen there needs to be a method for the male to introduce the sperm into the female's reproductive tract. 

Most taxa that reproduce by internal fertilization are gonochoric. In mammals, reptiles, and certain other groups of animals, this is done by copulation, an intromittent organ being introduced into the vagina or cloaca. In most birds, the cloacal kiss is used, the two animals pressing their cloacas together while transferring sperm. Salamanders, spiders, some insects and some molluscs undertake internal fertilization by transferring a spermatophore, a bundle of sperm, from the male to the female. Following fertilization, the embryos are laid as eggs in oviparous organisms, or continue to develop inside the reproductive tract of the mother to be born later as live young in viviparous organisms.

Evolution of internal fertilization 

Internal fertilization evolved many times in animals. According to David B. Dusenbery all the features with internal fertilization were most likely a result from oogamy. It has been argued that internal fertilization evolve because of sexual selection through sperm competition.

In amphibians internal fertilization evolved from external fertilization.

Methods of internal fertilization
Fertilization which takes place inside the female body is called internal fertilization in animals is done through the following different ways:
 Copulation, which involves the insertion of the penis or other intromittent organ into the vagina (in most mammals) or to the cloaca in monotremes, most reptiles, some birds, the amphibian tailed frog and some fish, the disappeared dinosaurs, as well as in other non-vertebrate animals. 
 Cloacal kiss, which consists in that the two animals touch their cloacae together in order to transfer the sperm of the male to the female. It is used in most birds and in the tuatara, that do not have an intromittent organ.
 Via spermatophore, a sperm-containing cap placed by the male in the female's cloaca. Usually, the sperm is stored in spermathecae on the roof of the cloaca until it is needed at the time of oviposition. It is used by some salamander and newt species, by the arachnida, some insects and some mollusks.
 In sponges, sperm cells are released into the water to fertilize ova that are retained by the female. Some species of sponge participate in external fertilization where the ova is released.

Expulsion

At some point, the growing egg or offspring must be expelled. There are several possible modes of reproduction. These are traditionally classified as follows:

 Oviparity, as in most invertebrates and reptiles, monotremes, dinosaurs and all birds which lay eggs that continue to develop after being laid, and hatch later. 
 Viviparity, as in almost all mammals (such as whales, kangaroos and humans) which bear their young live. The developing young spend proportionately more time within the female's reproductive tract.  The young are later released to survive on their own, with varying amounts of help from the parent(s) of the species.
 Ovoviviparity, as in the garter snake, most vipers, and the Madagascar hissing cockroach, which have eggs (with shells) that hatch as they are laid, making it resemble live birth.

Advantages to Internal Fertilization 
Internal fertilization allows for:

 Female mate choice, which gives the female the ability to choose her partner before and after mating. The female cannot do this with external fertilization because she may have limited control of who is fertilizing her eggs, and when they are being fertilized.
 Making a decision for the conditions of reproduction, like location and time. In external fertilization a female can only choose the time in which she releases her eggs, but not when they are fertilized. This is similar, in ways, to cryptic female choice.
 Egg protection on dry land. While oviparous animals either have a jelly like ovum or a hard shell enclosing their egg, internally fertilizing animals grow their eggs and offspring inside themselves. This offers protection from predators and from dehydration on land. This allows for a higher chance of survival when there is a regulated temperature and protected area within the mother.

Disadvantages to Internal Fertilization 

 Gestation can and will add additional risks for the mother. The additional risks from gestation come from extra energy demands.
 Along with internal fertilization comes sexual reproduction, in most cases. Sexual reproduction comes with some risks as well. The risks with sexual reproduction are with intercourse, it is infrequent and only works well during peak fertility. While animals which externally fertilize are able to release egg and sperm, usually into the water, not needing a specific partner to reproduce.
Fewer offspring are produced through internal fertilization in comparison to external fertilization. This is both because the mother cannot hold and grow as many offspring as eggs, and the mother cannot provide and obtain enough resources for a larger amount of offspring.

Fish 
Some species of fish like guppies have the ability to internally fertilize, this process happens by the male inserting a tubular fin into the female’s reproductive opening and then will deposit sperm into her reproductive tract. There are other species of fish that are mouthbrooders which means that one fish puts the eggs in its mouth for incubation. A certain type of fish that is a mouthbrooder is called cichlids and many of them are maternal mouthbrooders. The process for this is the female would lay the egg and pick it up in her mouth. Then the males will encourage the female to open her mouth so they can fertilize the eggs while it’s in the female’s mouth. Internal fertilization in cartilaginous fishes contains the same evolutionary origin as reptiles, birds, and mammals that internally fertilize. Also in these internally fertilizing fish while the sperm is transferred to the reproductive tract there is no noticeable change in tonality.

Amphibians 
Most amphibians have external fertilization but there is an exception to some like salamanders which mostly have internal fertilization. Salamanders do not use intercourse for sexual reproduction due to their lack of external penis. Rather, the male salamander produces an encased capsule of sperm and nutrients called a spermatophore. The male deposits a spermatophore on the ground and the female will pick it up with her cloaca (a combined urinary and genital opening) and fertilize her eggs with it. Over time amphibians have been found evolving to increasing internal fertilization. Within amphibians, it is common for high vertebrates to internally fertilize because of the transition from water to land during vertebrate evolution. There is an advantage for the amphibians who are internally fertilizing allowing for the selection of a time and place for reproduction.

Birds 
Most birds do not have penises, but achieve internal fertilization via cloacal contact (or “cloaca kiss”). In these birds, males and females contact their cloacas together, typically briefly, and transfer sperm to the female. However, water fowls such as ducks and geese have penises and are able to use them for internal fertilization.  While birds have internal fertilization, most species no longer have phallus structures. This makes them the only vertebrate taxon to fall into both categories of lacking the phallus but participating in internal fertilization.

See also 
 Insemination
Fertilization

References 

Reproduction in animals